James Randal Hall (born November 9, 1958) is the Chief United States district judge of the United States District Court for the Southern District of Georgia.

Education and career
Born in Augusta, Georgia, Hall received a Bachelor of Arts degree from Augusta College (now Augusta University) in 1979 and a Juris Doctor from the University of Georgia School of Law in 1982. During the summers of 1979, 1980, and 1981 he worked for Lightning Galleries Inc in Augusta. He was in private practice in Augusta, from 1982 to 1985, and was then vice-president & legal counsel of Bankers First Corporation until 1996, thereafter returning to private practice until 2008. He is a former director of Patriot Foods, LLC and Hall-Augusta Properties, LLC. He is also a former director of Georgia Carolina Bancshares, Inc. of the First Bank of Georgia.

Politics
He served in the Georgia State Senate representing the 22nd district from 2003 to 2004. Before that, he was a member of the Augusta-Richmond Planning Commission from 1997 to 2002. In 2006, Georgia Governor Sonny Perdue appointed him to the Governor’s Task Force on Redistricting. He was an unsuccessful candidate for election to the 23rd district of the Georgia State Senate in 2004. In 2005 he was appointed to the Georgia Medical Center Authority by Georgia state senator Eric Johnson.

Federal judicial service

On March 19, 2007, Hall was nominated by President George W. Bush to a seat on the United States District Court for the Southern District of Georgia vacated by Berry Avant Edenfield. Hall was confirmed by the United States Senate on April 10, 2008, and received his commission on April 29, 2008. He became Chief Judge on May 5, 2017.

Sources

External links 
 
 Confirmation hearings on federal appointments : hearing before the Committee on the Judiciary, United States Senate, One Hundred Tenth Congress, first session pt.3 2007 

1958 births
Living people
20th-century American lawyers
21st-century American lawyers
21st-century American judges
Augusta University alumni
Republican Party Georgia (U.S. state) state senators
Judges of the United States District Court for the Southern District of Georgia
People from Augusta, Georgia
United States district court judges appointed by George W. Bush
University of Georgia School of Law alumni